Coupe des Nations 1930 was a football tournament in the summer of 1930 in Geneva, Switzerland, organized by local club Servette FC. Servette had just won the Swiss championship, and organized this event as a counterpoint to the first FIFA World Cup held at the same time in Uruguay, to which only few European countries (Belgium, France, Romania and Yugoslavia) sent a team. The tournament also marked the inauguration of the Stade des Charmilles.

Some people regard this competition as a predecessor of UEFA Champions League, since it was the first organized competition for the national champion teams in Europe. The champions of all major European football nations of the pre-war years were invited, except for the British Home Nations, who were withdrawn from FIFA at the time.

The competition was won by Hungarian Újpest FC who scored 16 goals and conceded only 1 in 4 games. After winning the Coupe des Nations trophy, Újpest declared themselves 'Champion of the Champions'.

In later years several attempts were made to create a tournament for the Champions of Europe. North-Italian cities were planning to host the competition in 1931, but it was abandoned due to financial reasons. Finally in 1937, during the Paris Expo a tournament was held as a successor of the Geneva tournament, but only two champion teams accepted the invitation. After the tournament Zürich, as the host of the 1939 Expo and Rome, the 1942 host made attempts to create the tournament, but both city's attempts failed. The next time that the major European champions were called together was after the 1954 creation of UEFA who started the European Cup in 1955.

Participants
  First Vienna FC        (cup winners 1929 and 1930; 3rd in league 1928/29)
  FC Sète         (cup winners 1929/30)
  AGC Bologna            (national champions 1928/29)
  Go Ahead         (national champions 1929/30)
  Real Unión Irún        (cup winners 1927; 6th in league 1929/30)
  Servette FC       (national champions 1929/30)
  R. CS Brugeois       (national champions 1929/30)
  Slavia Prague       (national champions 1929/30)
  SpVgg Fürth       (national champions 1929)
  Újpest FC       (national champions 1929/30 and Mitropa Cup winner 1929)

Notes:
 Apparently Real Unión Irún were announced as Spanish champions 1929, which is most certainly wrong (they were 9th in the league 1928/29 and eliminated in the 1/16 finals of the domestic cup).
 Both Bologna and Irún had been allowed to field some players not signed with the club.
 The Greek and Norwegian FAs sent protest letters because their champions had not been invited.
 The tournament was supposed to have 12 participants, but Sheffield Wednesday, the English champions, were not invited because they were withdrawn from FIFA, and S.L. Benfica, the Portuguese champions, rejected the invitation.
Bologna arrived too late at the tournament, so the match versus Go Ahead was after the first game of the quarterfinals. The loser of the match received a bye to the next round.

First round

Consolation round (losers first round)

(Losing teams eliminated, winners progress to quarterfinals)

Quarter-finals

Semi-finals

Third place match

Final

Match details

|valign=top width=50%|

|}

Final classification
 1. Újpest
 2. Slavia
 3. First Vienna
 4. Servette
 5-8. Irún, Bologna, Fürth and Go Ahead
 9-10. Cercle Brugge and Sète

References

1929–30 in European football
Servette FC
International club association football competitions hosted by Switzerland
1929–30 in Swiss football